Martha Joan Swope (February 22, 1928 – January 12, 2017) was an American photographer of theatre and dance.

Early life and education
Born in Tyler, Texas, she studied at Baylor University in Waco, Texas, before becoming a student at the School of American Ballet in the 1950s.

Career
Her photography career started in 1957, when Jerome Robbins invited her to photograph rehearsals for West Side Story. Soon afterwards, Lincoln Kirstein hired her as the first official photographer for the New York City Ballet. She photographed figures in the dance world including George Balanchine, Michael Bennett, Joe Papp, and David Merrick. She was known for taking photos onstage while posed in the fourth position.

She documented over 800 productions in her lifetime. To her, rehearsals were "where you see the creativity and the interchange, how it grows to what it comes to be onstage".

She stopped taking photos when she retired in 1994, saying that "now I think it's somebody else's era".

Death
Swope died from Parkinson's disease on January 12, 2017, at the age of 88.

In media
Her photographs have been featured in many  newspapers and journals, including Life magazine and The New York Times. She donated her archive of 1.5 million images to the New York Public Library for the Performing Arts at Lincoln Center in 2010.

Awards and achievements
In 2004, Swope received a Tony Honor for Excellence in Theater award, and in 2007, she was given a lifetime achievement award from the League of Professional Theater Women.

Legacy
Swope's photographs were displayed in multiple books: Baryshnikov on Broadway: Photographs, Tanaquil Le Clercq's Mourka: The Autobiography of a Cat, Kenneth Laws's Physics and the Art of Dance, and Denny Martin Flinn's What They Did for Love: The Untold Story Behind the Making of A Chorus Line.

Personal life
She lived in a brownstone on 72nd Street in New York City. She used her bathroom as a darkroom and her closet was her film developing room.

Besides ballet and photography, Swope had an immense passion for animals and travel. She rescued and took care of stray dogs. One of her dogs was named "Topo". When she later moved to the Manhattan Plaza apartment complex on West 43rd Street, she adopted a greyhound mix named "Bert".

She also visited a sundry mix of places, such as Africa, Switzerland, and Italy. Although Swope had a lively and caring spirit, she was also very private about her personal life and actually avoided going to the theatre "because of crowds".

References

External links 
Martha Swope photographs, circa 1955 – circa 2002 (bulk 1957–1994), held by the Billy Rose Theatre Division, New York Public Library for the Performing Arts

1928 births
2017 deaths
20th-century American women photographers
20th-century American photographers
21st-century American women photographers
21st-century American photographers
Ballet photographers
Baylor University alumni
Deaths from Parkinson's disease
Neurological disease deaths in New York (state)
People from Hell's Kitchen, Manhattan
People from Tyler, Texas
Photographers from New York City
Photographers from Texas
School of American Ballet alumni
Theatrical photographers